| tries = {{#expr:
 + 6 + 1 + 9 + 9 + 8 + 14 + 7 + 10
 + 6 + 6 + 7 + 7 + 9 + 5 + 5 + 6
 + 8 + 7 + 7 + 6 + 0 + 5 + 7 + 5
 + 13 + 6 + 6 + 10 + 6 + 5 + 12 + 6
 + 3 + 4 + 8 + 7 + 9 + 6 + 9 + 11
 + 4 + 5 + 10 + 11 + 3 + 5 + 7 + 9
 + 6 + 4 + 4 + 6 + 4 + 5 + 9 + 7
 + 2 + 5 + 6 + 13 + 7 + 3 + 7 + 10
 + 9 + 7 + 7 + 6 + 7 + 5 + 5 + 4
+ 6 + 4 + 4 + 11 + 6 + 3 + 5 + 3
+ 4 + 8 + 8 + 8 + 8 + 3 + 8 + 7
+ 9 + 6 + 9 + 8 + 11 + 4 + 7 + 10
+ 8 + 10 + 8 + 8 + 5 + 6 + 3 + 9
+ 9 + 7 + 8 + 3 + 8 + 3 + 9 + 6
+ 3 + 8 + 7 + 8 + 6 + 6 + 1 + 8
+ 8 + 7 + 9 + 8 + 4 + 2 + 5 + 4
+ 6 + 3 + 4 + 5 + 4 + 3 + 7
+ 5 + 5 + 7 + 13 + 7 + 1 + 5 + 8
+ 5 + 5 + 6 + 6 + 8 + 6 + 5
+ 4 + 6 + 7 + 4 + 8 + 11 + 3 + 4
+ 10 + 7 + 5 + 4 + 4 + 2 + 4
+ 8 + 4 + 6 + 7 + 3 + 6
+ 8 + 7 + 8 + 6 + 3 + 2
+ 4 + 5 + 6
+ 4 + 7 + 6 + 7 + 2 + 5 + 6 + 7
+ 8 + 7 + 9 + 7 + 4 + 11 + 8 + 4
+ 7 + 5
+ 5 + 5 + 5 + 7 + 10 + 9 + 6 + 10
+ 4 + 6 + 6 + 4 + 10 + 7 + 5 + 4
+ 6 + 11 + 5 + 8 + 9 + 5 + 8 + 9
+ 4 + 12 + 3 + 4 + 12 + 7 + 10 + 7
+ 2
+ 8 + 12 + 7 + 12 + 6 + 11 + 2 + 11
+ 13
}}
| top point scorer =  Clifford Hodgson (Coventry) 374
| top try scorer =  Tyson Lewis  (Doncaster Knights) 22
| prevseason = 2012–13
| nextseason = 2014–15
}}

The 2013–14 National League 1, known for sponsorship reasons as the SSE National League 1 is the fifth season of the third tier of the English domestic rugby union competitions, since the professionalised format of the second tier RFU Championship was introduced. After being relegated last season, Doncaster Knights are the champions and became the first team to be promoted straight back to the RFU Championship for the 2014-15 season. The teams promoted last season from 2012–13 National League 2 South and 2012–13 National League 2 North, Henley Hawks, Hull Ionians and Worthing Raiders finished in the bottom three places with Henley and Worthing to join the 2014–15 National League 2 South and Ionians to the 2014–15 National League 2 North.

Participating teams and locations

After eight seasons in the second tier, Doncaster Knights find themselves playing in this league following their relegation from the RFU Championship. Henley Hawks and Hull Ionians were promoted as champions of their respected leagues National League 2 South and National League 2 North respectively. The third team to win promotion to the league was Worthing Raiders who beat Stourbridge in the promotion play-off 28–26. It is the first appearance at this level for both Hull Ionians and Worthing Raiders.

Structure
The league consists of sixteen teams with all the teams playing each other on a home and away basis to make a total of thirty matches each. There is one promotion place and three relegation places.

League table

Fixtures

Round 1

Round 2

Round 3

Round 4

Round 5

Round 6

Round 7

Round 8

Round 9

Round 10

Round 11

Round 12

Round 13

Round 14

Round 15

Round 16

Round 17

Round 18

Round 19

Round 20

Round 21

Round 22

Round 23

Postponed matches (1)

Round 24

Round 25

 The above match was the 150th anniversary of rugby's oldest fixture.

Postponed matches (2)

Round 26

Round 27

Round 28

Round 29

Postponed match (3)

Round 30

Postponed match (4)

Season records

Team
Largest home win — 53 pts 
67 – 14 Coventry v Hull Ionians on 26 April
Largest away win — 48 pts
12 – 60 Rosslyn Park at Hull Ionians on 12 April
Most points scored — 67pts
67 – 14 Coventry v Hull Ionians on 26 April
Most points scored away from home — 60 pts
12 – 60 Rosslyn Park at Hull Ionians on 12 April
Most tries in a match — 10
63 – 21 Coventry v Blackheath on 26 October
12 – 60 Rosslyn Park at Hull Ionians on 12 April
67 – 14 Coventry v Hull Ionians on 26 April
Most conversions in a match — 8
Esher home to Tynedale on 9 November
Fylde home to Loughborough Students on 26 January
Most penalties in a match — 7
Wharfdale v Loughborough Students on 21 SeptemberWharfdale at Tynedale on 28 September
Most drop goals in a match — 1 
N/A - multiple teams

Player
Most points in a match — 28 pts
Clifford Hodgson for Coventry at home to Blackheath on 26 October
Most tries in a match — 4
Ben Frankland for Tynedale home to Blackheath on 18 January
Howe for Rosslyn Park at Hull Ionians on 12 April
Most conversions in a match — 8
Luke Daniels for Esher home to Tynedale on 9 November
Most penalties in a match — 7
Tom Barrett for Wharfdale at home to Loughborough Students on 21 September
Tom Barrett for Wharfdale at Tynedale on 28 September

Most drop goals in a match — 1 
N/A - multiple players
Fastest try from kick-off
7.24 seconds by Tyson Lewis for Doncaster Knights at Old Albanians – the fastest ever try by a professional rugby union player. The try was originally timed at 8.13 seconds, but Guinness World Records recorded it as 7.24 seconds. The previous record was 8.28 seconds by Lee Blackett for Leeds Carnegie at home to Newcastle Falcons in the 2007–08 English Premiership.

Attendances
Highest — 1,756
Rosslyn Park at home to Doncaster Knights on 29 March 2014
Lowest — 100
Loughborough Students at home to Hull Ionians on 22 March 2014
Highest Average Attendance — 1,198	
Coventry
Lowest Average Attendance — 283				
Hull Ionians

Total Season Attendances

Leading scorers

Leading points scorers

Top try scorers

References

External links
 NCA Rugby

National
National League 1 seasons